Tishani Doshi (born 9 December 1975) is an Indian poet, journalist and dancer based in Chennai. In 2006 she won the Forward Prize for her debut poetry book Countries of the Body. Her poetry book A God at the Door has been shortlisted for the 2021  Forward Prize under best poetry collection category.

Early life and education
Doshi was born in Madras, India, to a Welsh mother and Gujarati father. She completed a bachelor's degree in the United States, at Queen's College in Charlotte, North Carolina. She graduated with a master's degree in creative writing... from the Johns Hopkins University.

Career
Doshi works as a freelance writer and journalist. She has worked with choreographer Chandralekha. 
Her short story "Lady Cassandra, Spartacus and the dancing man" was published in its entirety in the journal The Drawbridge in 2007. Her poetry collection, Everything Begins Elsewhere, was published by Bloodaxe Books in the UK in 2012 and by Copper Canyon Press in the US in 2013.

Award winning works
In 2001 Tishani won the Eric Gregory Award for young poets under 30 years. Tishani's first poetry collection, Countries of the Body was launched in 2006 at the Hay-on-Wye festival on a platform with Seamus Heaney, Margaret Atwood, and others. The opening poem, "The Day we went to the Sea", won the 2005 British Council-supported All India Poetry Prize. The book won the 2006 Forward Poetry Prize for best first collection.  Her first novel, The Pleasure Seekers, was published by Bloomsbury in 2010. It was long-listed for the Orange Prize in 2011, and also shortlisted for The Hindu Best Fiction Award in 2010.

Her poetry book Girls Are Coming Out of the Woods was a Poetry Book Society Recommendation and was shortlisted for the Ted Hughes Award in 2018. Her 2019 book, Small Days and Nights, was shortlisted for the 2020 Ondaatje Prize.
Tishani has been a finalist at Outlook-Picador Non-Fiction Competition. She also received honorary invitation to the poetry galas of Hay Festival of 2006 and Cartagena Hay Festival of 2007.

Other activities
Tishani Doshi delivered the keynote address at the 13th annual St. Martin Book Fair on the Caribbean island of St. Maarten (St. Martin) in 2015. Her book The Adulterous Citizen – poems  stories  essays (2015) was launched at the festival by House of Nehesi Publishers.

She writes a blog titled "Hit or Miss" on Cricinfo, a cricket-related website. In the blog, which she started writing in April 2009, Tishani Doshi makes observations and commentaries as a television viewer of the second season of the Indian Premier League. She is also collaborating with cricketer Muttiah Muralitharan on his biography, to be published when he retires.

Books
 2006: Countries of the Body (poetry)
 2008: Conflict and Instability (with [Tobias Hill] and Aoife Mannix)
 2010: The Pleasure Seekers (fiction)
 2012: Everything Begins Elsewhere (poetry), Bloodaxe Books, UK, 2012; Copper Canyon Press, United States, 2013.
 2013: Fountainville (fiction), Seren Books
 2013: Madras Then, Chennai Now (with Nanditha Krishna)
 2015: The Adulterous Citizen: poems  stories  essays (House of Nehesi Publishers)
 2017: Girls Are Coming Out of the Woods (poetry), HarperCollins, India; Bloodaxe Books, UK, 2018; Copper Canyon Press, United States, 2018.
 2019: Small Days and Nights (Bloomsbury)
 2021: A god at the door

References

External links 

 
 Tishani Doshi at the Poetry Foundation

1975 births
Indian women poets
Living people
Writers from Chennai
Gujarati people
Indian people of Welsh descent
Poets from Tamil Nadu
21st-century Indian poets
21st-century Indian women writers
21st-century Indian writers
21st-century Indian journalists
Women writers from Tamil Nadu